Kozhukkattai ( or kozhukatta is a popular South Indian dumpling made from rice flour, with a filling of grated coconut, jaggery, or chakkavaratti. Kozhukattai, although usually sweet, can sometimes be stuffed with a savory filling. It is also prepared by Kerala Christians on the Saturday prior to Palm Sunday and the day is hence called Kozhukatta Saturday. Modak is a similar dish made in other parts of India. This is a popular dish prepared during the Ganesh Chaturthi festival.

Preparation
The dish is prepared by mixing grated coconut with jaggery syrup, placing it inside dumplings of rice flour, and steaming the dumplings. Ghee, cardamom, finely ground roasted rice flour etc. may be added to enhance the taste and flavour of the filling. In Kerala, a variant of kozhukattai made with atta flour (instead of rice flour) and grated coconut is a staple breakfast among some groups.

Popular culture
In Tamil Nadu, the dish is traditionally associated with the Hindu God Ganesha and is prepared as an offering (naivedhya) on the occasion of Vinayaka Chathurthi. It is prepared by Kerala Christians on the Saturday prior to Palm Sunday and the day is hence called Kozhukatta Saturday. In Kerala, it is also eaten as an evening snack with tea or coffee.

Kozhukkattai is an important part of several natal customs of the Sri Lankan Tamil community. In northern Sri Lanka, there is a custom involving dumplings whose edges are pressed to resemble teeth being dropped gently on a baby's head while the family wishes for the infant to develop healthy teeth. In eastern areas of Sri Lanka such as Amparai district, a smaller version called piḷḷai kozhukkaṭṭai is prepared by female family members for an expectant mother about four months after conception. These sweets are commonly exchanged at weddings as auspicious symbols of "plump" health and fertility.

Making

See also

List of Indian sweets and desserts
Thennai Kozhakkattai
Manda pitha
Momo (dumpling)
List of dumplings

References

External links

 Recipe for making kozhakattai
  Kozhukattai in Tamil literature

Indian desserts
South Indian cuisine
Kerala cuisine
Foods containing coconut
Dumplings
Konkani cuisine
Hindu symbols